Campbell Gullan (1881, in Glasgow – 1 December 1939, in New York City) was a Scottish actor.

Partial filmography

 Caste (1915) - Sam Gerridge
 Far from the Madding Crowd (1915)
 The Great Adventure (1916) - Reporter
 A Place in the Sun (1916) - Arthur Blagden
 Comin' Thro' the Rye (1916) - George Tempest
 Milestones (1916) - Sir John Rhead
 Charity (1919) - Samuel Pester
 A Member of Tattersall's (1919) - Foxey
 The Right Element (1919) - Frank Kemble
 Damaged Goods (1919) - George Dupont
 Love in the Wilderness (1920) - Hon. Dicky Byrd
 At the Mercy of Tiberius (1920) - Col. Luke Darrington
 Her Story (1920) - Oscar Kaplan
 The Honeypot (1920) - Lord Chalfont
 Love Maggy (1921) - Lord Chalfont
 Mr. Pim Passes By (1921) - Carraway Pim
 Tilly of Bloomsbury (1921) - Percy Welwyn
 Single Life (1921) - Gerald Hunter
 The Game of Life (1922) - Edward Travers
 If Four Walls Told (1922) - David Rysling
 The Right to Strike (1923) - Montague
 Lily of the Alley (1923) - Sharkey
 The Hotel Mouse (1923) - Merchant
 Strangling Threads (1923) - Martin Forsdyke KC
 I Pagliacci (1923) - Tonio
 Castles in the Air (1923)
 S.O.S. (1928) - Karensky
 Pleasure Crazed (1929) - Gilbert Ferguson
 Inquest (1931) - Norman Dennison
 The Flying Squad (1932) - Tiser
 Red Ensign (1934) - Hannay
 Jew Süss (1934) - Prince of Thurn & Taxis
 The Iron Duke (1934) - D'Artois
 The Price of a Song (1935) - Arnold Grierson
 East Meets West (1936) - Veka
 The End of the Road (1936) - David
 Wedding Group (1936)
 The Black Tulip (1937) - Isaac Boxtel
 The Last Curtain (1937) - Sir Alan Masterville
 The Claydon Treasure Mystery (1938) - Tollemache

References

External links

1881 births
1939 deaths
Scottish male stage actors
Scottish male film actors
Scottish male silent film actors
Male actors from Glasgow
20th-century Scottish male actors